Jeff Danziger (born 1943 in New York, New York) is a syndicated political cartoonist and author.

Danziger was listed on Bernard Goldberg's list of "100 People Who Are Screwing Up America." Danziger described the listing as "an honor."

Biography 
Danziger served in the United States Army from 1967 until 1971. An intelligence officer and linguist during the Vietnam War, he was awarded the Bronze Star and Air Medal in 1970. In 1971 he began teaching English at Union 32 High School in East Montpelier, Vermont, where he taught specialized classes in journalism and expository writing at an advanced level, and worked for the Christian Science Monitor between 1987 and 1997. As of 2009, he has been published by the Los Angeles Times Syndicate. He now lives in New York City.

Work 
Danziger lampooned the George W. Bush administration in many of his cartoons, some of which are collected in the anthologies Wreckage Begins with 'W''' and Blood, Debt and Fears. In an interview with The Comics Journal, Danziger said, "Keep in mind that I agree with a great many things that the Republicans have been traditionally for. I am in favor of a solid economy. I am in favor of a strong dollar. I am in favor of looking after troops. I am in favor of maintaining a strong army, and I am in favor of the ability to go into business and make a profit and not pay taxes for silly purposes."

In addition to his editorial cartoons, he also created the comic strip McGonigle of the Chronicle (distributed by the Field Newspaper Syndicate), which ran from 1983 to 1985 in newspapers across the country, and a weekly series, The Teeds: Tales of Agriculture for the Young and Old that continues to run in Vermont newspapers.Rutland Herald's 'Notable Contributors' list He also created the short-lived syndicated comic strip Stitches, about a doctor's office, that was syndicated by the Washington Post Writers Group from 1997 to 1998.

Controversial cartoons
In 2005, when Condoleezza Rice was nominated to be U.S. Secretary of State, Danziger drew cartoon that was critical of Rice where he used racial stereotypes concerning the look and speech of African Americans. Danziger was criticized by the National Black Republican Association who stated that Danziger "depicted Dr. Rice as an ignorant, barefoot "mammy," reminiscent of the stereotyped black woman in the movie Gone with the Wind who remarked:  "I don't know nothin' 'bout birthin' no babies.'"

In October 2005, Danziger published a cartoon in the Rutland Herald depicting a scientist unearthing a roulette wheel at an Abenaki archaeological site. Examining the artwork carefully, one finds in very small print "Sweat Lodge Casino." The portrayal of Indians as casino operators outraged Native Americans across the country and highlighted a larger part of Indian portrayal in the media. The Barre Montpelier Times Argus'' wrote: "Publishers of newspapers think it's okay to mock and offend Indians; they say, 'How could this possibly be racist, we're only kidding.' The institution of media is in denial about promoting racism. In fact, they don't even notice."

References

External links
 
 
 

1943 births
Living people
American editorial cartoonists
American political writers
American male non-fiction writers
Recipients of the Air Medal